The 2001 Eastern Illinois Panthers represented Eastern Illinois University as a member of the Ohio Valley Conference (OVC) during the 2001 NCAA Division I-AA football season. Led by 15th-year head coach Bob Spoo, the Panthers compiled an overall record of 9–2, winning the OVC title with a conference mark of 6–1. Eastern Illinois was invited to the NCAA Division I-AA Football Championship playoffs, where they lost in the first round to Northern Iowa. The Bobcats were ranked ninth in the final Sports Network poll.

Schedule

References

Eastern Illinois
Eastern Illinois Panthers football seasons
Ohio Valley Conference football champion seasons
Eastern Illinois Panthers football